Revista Jurídica de la Universidad de Puerto Rico (University of Puerto Rico Law Journal) was established in March 1932 by Manuel Rodríguez Ramos and Manuel García Cabrera, and later Eulogio Riera and Gilberto Concepción de Gracia.

External links 
 

American law journals
Publications established in 1932
Spanish-language journals
Puerto Rican law
Mass media in Puerto Rico
1932 establishments in Puerto Rico